Colonel Sir James Dennis Compton Faulkner   (22 October 1926 – 31 December 2016) was a Northern Irish officer, who served in the Royal Navy and British Army. He was the Regimental Colonel of the Ulster Defence Regiment from 1982 to 1992.

Life
Born on 22 October 1926, Faulkner was the brother of the former Northern Ireland Prime Minister Brian Faulkner. He served from 1946 to 1971 in the Royal Naval Volunteer Reserve, and reached the rank of lieutenant commander. He was then commissioned into the Ulster Defence Regiment (UDR) where he commanded the Boat Section of the 3rd (Co Down) Battalion. He ended his military career as Regimental Colonel of the UDR, serving from 1982 to 1992.

He was made a Commander of the Order of the British Empire (CBE) in 1980 and knighted in the 1991 New Year Honours. He held the office of Deputy Lieutenant (DL) to the Lord Lieutenant of County Down from 1988.

He died on 31 December 2016 at the age of 90.

References

Bibliography
 A Testimony to Courage – the Regimental History of the Ulster Defence Regiment 1969 – 1992, John Potter, Pen & Sword Books Ltd, 2001, 

1926 births
2016 deaths
Deputy Lieutenants of Down
Commanders of the Order of the British Empire
Knights Bachelor
People from County Down
People of The Troubles (Northern Ireland)
Royal Naval Volunteer Reserve personnel
Ulster Defence Regiment officers
Royal Navy officers